Gold is the ninth U.S. compilation album by American singer-actress Cher, released on March 1, 2005, by Geffen Records. The album was released only two years after the multi-platinum The Very Best of Cher. As of August 2010, the album has sold 88,000 copies in the United States. The album was certified silver by the British Phonographic Industry (BPI) in 2019 for selling over 60,000 copies.

Critical reception

Tim Sendra of AllMusic gave the compilation four-and-a-half out of five stars and stated "...this is a disc that will certainly please the fans who want a sampling of her career and don't really want rarities or surprises."

Track listing

Notes
"Believe" features writing contribution by Cher who remains uncredited.
 †The remix of "Heart of Stone" is the same one found on If I Could Turn Back Time: Cher's Greatest Hits, also released by Geffen Records.

Personnel
Cher - main vocals
Sonny Bono - main vocals
Peter Cetera - main vocals

Production
Mike Ragogna - compilation producer
Bill Inglot - mastering
Dan Hersch - mastering

Design
Kevyn Aucoin - photography
Michael Lavine - photography

Charts and certifications

Weekly charts

Certifications and sales

References

External links
Official Cher site
UMe Official Website

Cher
Cher compilation albums
2005 greatest hits albums